Zobida bipuncta is a moth of the subfamily Arctiinae. It is found in Larache, Morocco and the southern part of the Iberian Peninsula.

References

Moths described in 1824
Lithosiina